Z. montana may refer to:

Zamia montana, a plant in the family Zamiaceae
Zealanapis montana, a New Zealand spider